Lancaster Township is the name of some places in the U.S. state of Pennsylvania:

Lancaster Township, Butler County, Pennsylvania
Lancaster Township, Lancaster County, Pennsylvania

Pennsylvania township disambiguation pages